Eastwood Manor Farm Steading in East Harptree, Somerset, England is a Grade I listed building.

The farm including the site for the construction of Eastwood Manor was bought by Charles Adams Kemble (son of the Reverend Charles Kemble, rector of Bath) in the 1860s. A series of fishponds were created on the farm by damming a small stream.

Cast iron pillars support the brickwork and wagon roof. It contained several feed stores, two bullock yards with fountains, a flax mill, cider press and threshing machine. The machinery was powered by a water mill which was replaced by steam, oil and diesel engines.

See also

 List of Grade I listed buildings in Bath and North East Somerset

References

Houses completed in 1860
Grade I listed buildings in Bath and North East Somerset
Buildings and structures in Bath and North East Somerset
Agricultural buildings in England
Barns in England